This list of United States extradition treaties includes  116 countries. The first U.S. extradition treaty was with Ecuador, in force from 1873. The most recent U.S. extradition treaties are with Kosovo and Serbia, in force from 2019.
The U.S. does not have an extradition treaty with China,  Indonesia, Iran, Mongolia, Russia, Qatar, Saudi Arabia, Taiwan, Vietnam and other nations.

Legend
 Type L: List treaty
 Type DC: Dual criminality treaty

References

External links
18 U.S. Code § 3181 - Scope and limitation of chapter Cornell Law School, Legal Information Institute
2021-2022 Treaties in Force: Supplemental List of Treaties and Other International Agreements (PDF) U.S. Department of State

Extradition
United States treaties
Treaties
United States criminal law
International law
International criminal law